Schattwald is a municipality in the district of Reutte in the Austrian state of Tyrol.

Tourism
Schattwald is home to Wannenjoch Mountain House, which is a tourist resort that overlooks the ski valley below.

References

Cities and towns in Reutte District